Pic de la Fossa del Gegant is a mountain in Catalonia, Spain.

See also
Mountains of Catalonia

References

Mountains of Catalonia
Mountains of the Pyrenees